Regobarrosia is a genus of moths in the family Erebidae described by Watson in 1975.

Species
 Regobarrosia aureogrisea Rothschild, 1909
 Regobarrosia flavescens Walker, 1856
 Regobarrosia pseudoflavescens Rothschild, 1910
 Regobarrosia villiersi Toulgoët, 1984

References

Phaegopterina
Moth genera